This is a list of the Saudi Arabia national football team results from 1957 to 1979.

Results

1957

1961

1963

1967

1969

1970

1972

1975

1976

1977

1978

1979

References

External links
Saudi Arabia fixtures on eloratings.net
Saudi Team

1950s in Saudi Arabia
1960s in Saudi Arabian sport
1970s in Saudi Arabian sport
1957